Pingyang railway station, formerly known as Aojiang railway station, is a railway station located in Pingyang County, Wenzhou, Zhejiang Province, China, on the Wenzhou–Fuzhou railway which is operated by Shanghai Railway Bureau, China Railway Corporation.

The station name was renamed from Aojiang to Pingyang on July 15, 2019.

References

Railway stations in Zhejiang
Railway stations in China opened in 2009